Events in the year 1937 in Turkey.

Parliament
 5th Parliament of Turkey

Incumbents
President – Kemal Atatürk
Prime Minister 
İsmet İnönü (up to 20 September)
Celal Bayar (from 20 September acting, from 1 November de jure)

Ruling party and the main opposition
 Ruling party – Republican People's Party (CHP)

Cabinet
8th government of Turkey (up to 1 November)
9th government of Turkey(from 1 November)

Events
5 January: Amendment in constitution; Six Arrows were implemented
12 May: Kemal Atatürk dedicated his farms to the treasury 
17 May: Divriği iron ore, the largest in Turkey was spotted 
29 May: Hatay agreement with France
9 July: Saadabad Pact reached with Iraq, Iran, and Afghanistan.
14 September: Nyon agreement
25 October: Prime minister İsmet İnönü resigned. Celal Bayar was appointed as the new prime minister.
1 November: New government

Births
1 January – Şenol Birol, footballer
20 January – Özkan Sümer, footballer, coach
1 April – Yılmaz Güney, actor
20 April – Yılmaz Onay, author
1 May – Üner Tan, MD, biologist
14 November – Önder Sav, politician
16 August – Ergun Öztuna, footballer
18 August – Duygun Yersuvat, Galatasaray S.K. (sports club) chairman
8 September – Cüneyt Arkın (Fahrettin Cüreklibakır), actor
29 October  – Ayla Algan, singer
8 December – Erol Çevikçe , politician

Deaths
11 January – Nuri Conker, military officer (Atatürk's friend)
12 April – Abdülhak Hamit Tarhan (born in 1852), writer, diplomat
10 October – Ahmet Refik Altınay (born in 1881), historian
15 November – Seyit Rıza (born in 1863), tribe leader

Gallery

References

 
Years of the 20th century in Turkey
Turkey
Turkey
Turkey